Epworth is a dormitory town in south-eastern Harare Province, Zimbabwe. Its population exploded in the late 1970s and 1980s as an informal settlement.

Background 

Epworth is located about twelve kilometres from the Harare city centre. It is a high-density dormitory town administered by the Epworth Local Board. It is bisected by a stream into two parts. The Balancing Rocks found in the northern approaches of the town are famous, and are featured on all bank notes issued by the Reserve Bank of Zimbabwe.

History 

Epworth Mission was established by the Rev. Shimmin as a Methodist Mission Station more than a century ago, in 1890. Epworth then and to this day is divided into 7 wards.

A large influx of people occurred during the late 1970s and early 1980s with the population being 20,000 in 1980 and 35,000 in 1987. The Methodist Church could not control the influx of people, and therefore transferred ownership of the farm to the Ministry of Local Government in 1983. By 2002 the population was 113,884. Epworth had not been planned as an urban residential area, and therefore this rapid increase in population was occurring on land without any water supply or sanitation facilities. Epworth became the only informal settlement to have been tolerated by the Zimbabwean Government in the post-independence period because of the long history of settlement and because of its size.
The government decided to upgrade rather than demolish the informal settlement. Since most residents of Epworth had squatted in the area spontaneously, public utilities such as water, sewage and electricity were lacking before government intervention. A Local Board formed in 1986 under the Urban Councils Act, and whose members are elected by the community, is responsible for managing the area including the collection of rates and other levies.

Epworth was initially developed into four sub-areas but as the population increased it expanded to nine sub-areas that had extensive squatter settlements. Health services are provided by two clinics in the area. Also, in Epworth there is a large rock that the people call "Domboramwari", which means rock of God.

Development status 

For the past 5 years all the well structured areas (Stopover, Domboramwari, Overspill, Glenwood and Chiremba now has electricity, a big improvement in the suburb, making it one of the most developing areas in Harare. There has been development , with a new suburb near Delport called Glenwood, which is well structured with morden houses making it one of the best developed, high density areas in Harare. However most unstructured and unregulated illegal structures in Dhonoro, Magada and the down part of Overspill are pulling the suburb backwards as there is no hope for development. Epworth is very clean and they have a unique way of managing their waste and the absence of a sewer system makes the community safe from diseases considering how unsustainable the sewer system has been in Harare. The majority of residents get by as street vendors and informal manufacturers.
There are no street names but most of the plots are numbered. The community is divided into suburbs that are demarcated by dust roads. Major suburbs include Chiremba, Stopover, Chinamano, Dam, Zinyengere, Pentagon, Magada, Overspill, Maulana, Dhonoro, Munyuki, and Danastein. It is a poor suburb. There are five secondary schools, namely Epworth High School, Domboramwari High School, Adelide secondary, Mabvazuva Secondary and Muguta Secondary School which was commissioned in 2007.

Since most of the houses found in the town are built from unburnt bricks, the houses are prone to falling during heavy rains. Due to the harsh economic times that the country has been passing through for the past decade, crime has been on the increase in the overcrowded suburb.

Government and politics 
Epworth is represented by the Epworth constituency in the National Assembly of the Parliament of Zimbabwe.

References 

Populated places in Harare Province
Squatting in Zimbabwe